The Perkins Great Eastern Run is a running event that takes place every year in Peterborough, United Kingdom, generally in mid-October. The event returned in 2006 after a 10-year absence and is rapidly gaining popularity. Currently, there are three races in the whole event:

Half Marathon – A  race which winds its way through the city's streets

Fun run – A 4 km run which starts and finishes at the same place as the half marathon

Wheelchair Race – This follows the same route as the half marathon

Despite its name, the Great Eastern Run is not a part of the Great Run series of events, which includes the Great North Run.

History of the Event

The first Great Eastern Run took place in 1982, boasting only a half marathon. The event was much less popular and well-known than it is today. This format existed until 1996, when the half marathon ceased and was replaced with two different events: A 10km run around the East of England Showground and a shorter race known as the Arthur Bowden 5. With so few events, the run became less and less popular and gradually deteriorated into almost nothing.

However, the Great Eastern Run was relaunched in 2006 with the half marathon returning as the main event, much to the delight of keen runners across the country. Roughly 3,000 runners took part in the whole event. A prize list of roughly £11,000 was announced, taking the race into the top five in the country for total prize money. Perkins Engines announced it would sponsor the 2006 race – the deal has been so successful that the company still sponsors the Great Eastern Run today. At the 2006 England Athletics East Region Awards, the Great Eastern Run's committee (consisting of Peterborough City Council, Perkins Engines and local running clubs) won the Athletics Partnership of the Year Award.

Due to the success of the 2006 event, the Great Eastern Run took place again in 2007, with well over 3,000 runners taking part. 2,285 people managed to complete the half marathon. The number of entrants for the event increased by 20%, with the number of fun runners almost doubling. In a poll of the readers of Runner's World magazine, the Great Eastern Run achieved a top 50 rating out of 736 races across the United Kingdom.

The 2008 event again saw an increase in the number of entrants, with approximately 4,450 runners taking to the streets of Peterborough.

Roughly 3,480 runners took part in the half marathon of the 2009 event, with about 1,300 people competing in the fun run. For the first time, the fun run was chip timed and was advertised as being 4 km in length (in previous years it had been advertised as 5 km). All three races were started by Barry Fry, the director of football at Peterborough United.

The 2010 event was unique because it took place at a time and date consisting purely of the number 10. The half marathon started at 10 seconds past 10:10, with the date being 10/10/10. Record numbers of runners took part, though the event was overshadowed by the deaths of two runners in the half marathon. Detective Constable Rob Davys collapsed during the race and was taken to Peterborough District Hospital. Despite the efforts of paramedics, he was later pronounced dead. A local runner named Matthew Ward (also a local teacher) also collapsed shortly after the race – he too was pronounced dead at the hospital. These were the first fatalities in the Great Eastern Run since the event was relaunched in 2006. The high temperatures meant that in total, 15 people required medical attention.

The 2011 was another record year with over 4,100 entering the Perkins Great Eastern Run. The winner, Edwin Kiptoo, completed the flat course in 62mins 28sec. Liz Yelling created a record by being the quickest woman, completing the course in 72mins 14secs.

In 2012 the Perkins Great Eastern Run, took place on 14 October and was one of only five runbritain Grand Prix races as well as being a UK Championship race.

In 2013 the Perkins Great Eastern Run, which took place on 13 October, reached a record number entries, which was beaten in 2016 when 4262 runners ran the half-marathon and 1257 people took part in the Anna’s Hope Fun Run. Organisers reported that at one stage during the event more than 10,000 people were in the crowds on The Embankment as runners crossed the finish line. In 2017, numbers declined very slightly with 4193 finishers in the half-marathon.

The 2019 half-marathon was cancelled owing to a major incident on the course.

Route
The route is very flat, with a rise of only 13 metres. All events start and finish on The Embankment beside the River Nene. The half marathon and wheelchair race then follow the same route. A full route map is available online at http://www.perkinsgreateasternrun.co.uk
The fun run route is 5k, only running as far Princes Gardens before heading down Eastfield Road and the same finishing straight as the half marathon.

Past winners

Original Race

New Race

Winners of the Wheelchair Race

 2007: Marc Poolman  0:47:41
 2008: Rob Wickham  0:40:05
 2009: Brian Alldis  0:53:23
 2010: Matthew Clarke  1:01:33

References

External links
 Official website

Athletics competitions in England
Half marathons in the United Kingdom
Recurring sporting events established in 1982
Sport in Peterborough
1982 establishments in England